is a snowboarding video game developed and published by Nintendo for the Nintendo 64 in 1998. In the game, the player controls one of five snowboarders from a third-person perspective, using a combination of buttons to jump and perform tricks over eight levels.

1080° was announced in November 1997 and developed over the course of nine months; it garnered critical acclaim and won an Interactive Achievement Award from the Academy of Interactive Arts & Sciences. 1080° sold over two million units. A sequel, 1080° Avalanche, was released for the GameCube in November 2003. The game was re-released in 2008 and 2016 for the Wii and Wii U Virtual Console, and is set to be re-released on the Nintendo Switch Online + Expansion Pack in 2023.

Gameplay 

Players control snowboarders in one of several modes. 1080° has two trick modes (trick attack and contest), three race modes (race, time attack, and 2 players), a training mode, and an options mode. The objective of the game is either to arrive quickly at a level's finish line or to receive maximum points for trick combinations.

In 1080° two trick modes, trick attack and contest, players accrue points from completed tricks. In contest mode, players perform tricks and snowboard past flags for points. Trick attack mode requires players to perform a series of tricks throughout a designated level. The game features 24 tricks and 5 secret tricks, all of which are performed by using a combination of circular positions of the control stick, the R button, the Z button and the B button; point values are allocated based on complexity, combos, and required time. The two types of tricks are grab tricks, in which the board is grabbed in a specific way, or spin tricks, in which the snowboarder spins the board a certain number of degrees. The 1080° spin requires nine actions, the most of any trick in the game.

1080° has three race modes; in these modes, victory can be achieved by taking separate routes within a course and balancing the snowboarder after a jump to avoid speed loss. Tricks are scored in race modes, but do not count toward victory. In match race mode, the player competes in a series of races against AI-controlled snowboarders. The game times the player throughout the level and players receive a damage meter which fills if the snowboarder falls down or is knocked over. The difficulty level in match races can be set to normal, hard, or expert, adjusting the complexity and number of races. If the player fails at defeating an AI competitor, they must retire. The player is given three chances to beat the computer before the game is over.

Players may initially choose from five snowboarding characters: two from Japan, and one each from Canada, the United States, and the United Kingdom. Each snowboarder has different abilities and is suited for different levels and modes, since each has varying statistics in fields such as technique, speed, and weight. Three additional snowboarders are unlocked by completing certain game levels and modes. Eight snowboards are initially available for every character, and one additional snowboard may be unlocked later in the game. Each board also excels in different situations, since each has different strengths in categories such as balance and edge control.

Development and release 
1080° release was announced on 21 November 1997 at Nintendo's Space World trade show; the game's working title had previously been Vertical Edge Snowboarding. 1080° was one of several snowboarding games released for the Nintendo 64 in 1998, others being Big Mountain 2000 and Snowboard Kids. Before the game's release, journalists were able to play 1080° at the January 1998 Nintendo Gamers' Summit.

1080° was directed by Masamachi Abe and Misthuro Tanako, programmed by Englishmen Giles Goddard and Colin Reed, developed and published by Nintendo, and produced by Shigeru Miyamoto. Abe had previously directed Tekken 3 for Namco. Goddard had previously programmed the Mario face in Super Mario 64, which was released two years prior to critical acclaim and was a huge commercial success, while Reed had programmed Stunt Race FX. According to Miyamoto, the game "came about because I like skiing. I was thinking about making a skiing game after completing Wave Race [64]. However, the current trend seems to be toward snowboarding. With snowboarding, it seems that you can go places that you can't with skis; for example, in between trees."

Development took place in Nintendo headquarters in Kyoto, Japan. When developing 1080°, Goddard and Reed used a technique called "skinning" to eliminate joints between the polygons composing the characters. Their programming used a combination of standard animation and inverse kinematics, creating characters whose appearance during collisions is affected by what object is hit, what direction the collision occurs in, and the speed at which the collision takes place. All of the characters' moves were created with motion capture. Tommy Hilfiger outfits and Lamar snowboards appear throughout 1080° as product placement. 1080° soundtrack of "techno and  beats" with "thrashy,  vocals" was composed by Kenta Nagata.

1080° development took place from April or May 1997 into early 1998. The game was released on 28 February 1998 in Japan and on 1 April in North America. Nintendo prioritized 1080° for Japanese release over other Nintendo 64 games because they wanted it out while there was still snow. Nintendo delayed the game's European release because they hoped to boost sales with a winter release; 1080° was eventually released on 30 November, 1998 in Europe and the PAL region.

Reception 

1080° Snowboarding received "generally favorable reviews", just two points shy of "universal acclaim", according to review aggregator website Metacritic. In Japan, Famitsu gave it a score of 31 out of 40. Nintendo Power gave the Japanese import a favorable review, over a month before it was released Stateside. It was called "one of the best values in both sports and racing gaming" by Josh Smith of GameSpot. 1080° Snowboarding has been perceived to be a leader among snowboarding titles at the time. Edge hailed it as the "most convincing video game emulation of the snowboarding experience so far" with an "atmosphere of sobriety" unlike any other Nintendo game at the time.

The game's graphics were of the highest quality for the Nintendo 64 at the time. Smith praised general aspects of the game's graphics such as their crispness, detail, smoothness, and lack of polygon dropout. Reviewers praised the game's camera use, the game's "very solid" physics model, the impression of racers' speed, and the game's snow effects (sun reflected in the snow as appropriate, and fluffy snow and packed snow appeared and behaved differently). Graphical faults included occasional pop-up, misplaced shadows, and lag when racers passed through on-track trees; these problems were generally identified as minor.

Although writing a positive review, Edge found faults in the game's AI, saying the game suffered from "cheating" CPU opponents. They criticized the AI's simplicity and ability to quickly catch up to the player near the end of a race; they also noted the AI's "limited series of predetermined routes" and the possibility of a player learning where and when an AI falls over, "offering an opportunity to pass [the computer], but conveying little satisfaction with it". Edge also said the PAL release delay "is frankly ludicrous". They believed that, due to Nintendo's slump of noteworthy releases, "any quality title is likely to top the charts with little difficulty".

Next Generation said that 1080° Snowboarding set the standard for an entire genre. Kevin Cheung of Hyper gave the game 90%: "There is little else more to say save that 1080 captures the true essence of the thrill of snowboarding. [...] Just as Waverace [sic] brought a new dimension to water-based racing, 1080 brings N64 owners an equally innovative game". GamePro said that the game was "the kind of great game that's worth snapping up as soon as it's out."

Writing for AllGame, Shawn Sackenheim considered the "highly technical" control scheme of 1080° Snowboarding one of the game's strengths despite its initial difficulty. Alex Huhtala of Computer and Video Games positively reviewed the control scheme, but disagreed on its difficulty, noting "the controls have been implemented so brilliantly that you're able to play perfectly well with just one hand on the stick and Z button". GameSpot called the game's control "thoroughly involving" and said that "[t]he crouch move alone which makes for supertight turns makes this fun to play". The music was also generally praised, with Matt Casamassina of IGN calling it "a shining example of what can be achieved on the format" and Sackenheim calling it "one of the best N64 soundtracks to date". Sackenheim also praised the game's sound effects.

In a retrospective review by the Official Nintendo Magazine in 2006, Steve Jarratt commented that 1080° Snowboarding "boasted the best video game representation of snow" and was complemented by "swooshy" sound effects. Positive comments were also made about handling and the quality of the multiplayer. In summary, Jarratt believed "this was a straight-up snowboarder, stunt-free but fast and fun". The magazine also ranked it the 87th best game available on Nintendo platforms. The staff felt it was the most realistic snowboarding game ever made.

The game won the Academy of Interactive Arts & Sciences' 1999 Console Sports Game of the Year award. It was also nominated for Best Nintendo 64 Game at the 1998 CNET Gamecenter Awards, which went to The Legend of Zelda: Ocarina of Time.

PC Data, which tracked sales in the United States, reported that 1080° Snowboarding sold 817,529 units and earned $40.9 million in revenues by the end of 1998. This made it the country's seventh-best-selling Nintendo 64 release of the year. The game ultimately sold 1,230,000 units in the United States, and over 23,000 in Japan. It did not, however, match the success of the developers' first game, Wave Race 64 which sold 1,950,000 units in the United States and 154,000 in Japan. 1080° Snowboarding was re-released on the Wii's Virtual Console service in 2008.

Sequel 
1080° Avalanche, a sequel to 1080° Snowboarding, was released for the GameCube in 2003. Greg Kasavin of GameSpot gave the sequel a harsher critical reception due to "frame rate issues and limited gameplay".

References

Notes

External links 
 1080° Snowboarding at Nintendo.com (archives of the original at the Internet Archive)
  
 

1998 video games
Interactive Achievement Award winners
Multiplayer and single-player video games
Nintendo 64 games
Nintendo 64-only games
1080° (video game series)
Nintendo Entertainment Analysis and Development games
Snowboarding video games
Video games developed in Japan
Virtual Console games for Wii
Virtual Console games for Wii U
D.I.C.E. Award for Sports Game of the Year winners
Nintendo Switch Online games